The Universal Party was a minor political party in South Africa. In the election of 22 April 2009 it appeared only on the Western Cape provincial ballot, and received 599 votes (0.03% of votes cast).

It did not contest the 2014 election and is no longer registered by the Independent Electoral Commission.

References

Defunct political parties in South Africa
Political parties with year of disestablishment missing
Political parties with year of establishment missing